Newton-le-Willows is a village and civil parish in the Richmondshire district of North Yorkshire, England,  west of Bedale. Historically, it is part of the North Riding of Yorkshire and the Wapentake of Hang East.

Newton-le-Willows used to have a railway station on the Wensleydale Railway. The station opened with the Bedale to Leyburn extension of the line in 1856. In 1877 the station was renamed as Jervaulx to avoid confusion with the other Newton-le-Willows railway station near to St Helens. The stations on the line were all closed in 1954, but the one at Jervaulx was used beyond the closure date to transport pupils to and from Aysgarth School on excursions. Whilst the Wensleydale Railway has reopened as a heritage railway, the station has remained closed.

Education
It was founded in 1877 and was originally based near Aysgarth but moved to its current site in 1890.

References

External links

Villages in North Yorkshire
Civil parishes in North Yorkshire